In first-order logic, a Herbrand structure S is a structure over a vocabulary σ that is defined solely by the syntactical properties of  σ. The idea is to take the symbols of terms as their values, e.g. the denotation of a constant symbol c is just "c" (the symbol). It is named after Jacques Herbrand.

Herbrand structures play an important role in the foundations of logic programming.

Herbrand universe

Definition

The Herbrand universe serves as the universe in the Herbrand structure.

Example

Let , be a first-order language with the vocabulary 
 constant symbols: c
 function symbols: f(·), g(·)

Notice that the relation symbols are not relevant for a Herbrand universe.

Herbrand structure
A Herbrand structure interprets terms on top of a Herbrand universe.

Definition

Let S be a structure, with vocabulary σ and universe U. Let W be the set of all terms over σ and W0 be the subset of all variable-free terms. S is said to be a Herbrand structure iff
 
  for every n-ary function symbol  and 
 c = c for every constant c in σ

Remarks

 A Herbrand structure that is a model of a theory T is called the Herbrand model of T.

Examples

For a constant symbol c and a unary function symbol f(.) we have the following interpretation:
 
 
 c → c

Herbrand base
In addition to the universe, defined in Herbrand universe, and the term denotations, defined in Herbrand structure, the Herbrand base completes the interpretation by denoting the relation symbols.

Definition

A Herbrand base is the set of all ground atoms of whose argument terms are the Herbrand universe.

Examples

For a binary relation symbol R, we get with the terms from above:

See also
 Herbrand's theorem
 Herbrandization
 Herbrand interpretation

Notes

References
 

Mathematical logic